Pinus muricata, the bishop pine, is a pine with a very restricted range: mostly in California, including several offshore Channel Islands, and a few locations in Baja California, Mexico. It is always on or near the coast.

In San Luis Obispo County it is found alone or in stands scattered on the coastal mountains and hills from Morro Bay to Shell Beach. A few stands of the tree are seen on the hills above the Sycamore Canyon Resort in Avila Beach. Within the City of San Luis Obispo, the Terrace Hill Open Space has several scattered specimens. Bishop pine seems to prefer already disturbed, unvegetated areas where it probably faces less competition from oaks and shrubs.

The common name "bishop pine" resulted from the tree having been first identified near the Mission of San Luis Obispo in San Luis Obispo, California. This tree has a large number of common names and other prior scientific names, due primarily to numerous variant forms. Other English names that have occasionally been used are prickle cone pine, Obispo pine, Santa Cruz pine and dwarf marine pine.

Description
The species is often smaller, stunted and twisted in coastal exposures. It is drought-tolerant and grows on dry, rocky soil.

Cones occur in one to five clusters. The cones remain unopened for many years until fire or strong heat causes them to open and release the seeds.

Forms
There are two Pinus muricata forms: 
 a southern form with bright green needles
 a northern form with dark blue-green needles.

The resin composition also differs. The dividing line between the two is very sharp, five miles (8 km) south of the boundary between Mendocino County and Sonoma County, California. Experimental attempts to hybridize the two forms have consistently failed, indicating that their taxonomic relationship may be more distant than the very small differences in appearance would suggest.

Ecology

Pinus muricata is found with several oak and cypress associates within the California Coast Ranges. There are also a number of common understory flora associates including sword fern, salal and western poison oak. Notable occurrences of P. muricata is in association with Mendocino cypress as a pygmy forest on coastal terraces in Mendocino County and Sonoma County, including one location within Salt Point State Park. It is classified an endangered species in Mexico.

Uses
Pinus muricata has been used in plantations with resultant growth rates higher than in the wild, but with adverse impacts to biodiversity.

This plant has ornamental value, and is cultivated in parks and gardens. It has gained the Royal Horticultural Society's Award of Garden Merit.

References

External links

 
 
 

muricata
Trees of Baja California
Trees of the Southwestern United States
Flora of California
Natural history of the California chaparral and woodlands
Trees of mild maritime climate